Colias caucasica balcanica is a butterfly in the family Pieridae. It is the European subspecies of Colias caucasica. It is found in Bosnia and Herzegovina, Bulgaria, Serbia, Montenegro, North Macedonia and Greece. It used to be considered a distinct species (Colias balcanica).

References

Butterflies described in 1901
caucasica balcanica
Butterfly subspecies